Wyco de Vries (born 13 May 1968) is a Dutch water polo player. He competed in the men's tournament at the 1996 Summer Olympics.

References

External links
 

1968 births
Living people
Dutch male water polo players
Olympic water polo players of the Netherlands
Water polo players at the 1996 Summer Olympics
People from Bodegraven
Sportspeople from South Holland
20th-century Dutch people